Eudentalium is a genus of molluscs belonging to the family Dentaliidae.

The species of this genus are found in Australia.

Species:
 Eudentalium quadricostatum (Brazier, 1877)

References

Molluscs